Lisa Krasner is a Republican member of the Nevada Senate. She represents the 16th district, which covers Storey County, Carson City, and parts of Washoe County.

Biography
Krasner was born in California. She received a Bachelor's degree from the University of California, Los Angeles and a Juris Doctor degree from the University of La Verne College of Law. She is an adjunct professor at Truckee Meadows Community College where she teaches in the political science department. Prior to that she taught courses at the University of Phoenix for six years. Krasner served as a Commissioner for the State of Nevada Commission on Aging for senior citizens for three years. She was appointed by Governor Sandoval. Prior to that Krasner served as a Commissioner on the City of Reno Recreation and Parks Commission for seven years, where she advocated for a family friendly environment in our community. She served on the Board of the State of Nevada PTA. She also served as President of the Reno Philharmonic Guild.

Krasner first ran for the Assembly in 2014 against incumbent Randy Kirner. While she finished second in the Republican primary, she advanced to the general election because no Democratic or Independent American candidates declared and no primary candidate received more than 50% of the vote. In the general election, Krasner lost by a mere 11 votes.

In 2015, Krasner announced she would run for the NV State Assembly. She won the Republican primary and ran unopposed in the general election, garnering more than 30,000 votes from all party affiliations.

Personal life
Krasner and her husband, Charles, a doctor, have two sons.

Political positions
Krasner is a Republican. In the 2017 Nevada Legislative session Krasner successfully passed AB145- Extends the statute of limitations for child victims of sexual abuse. The Bill was signed into law by Governor Sandoval in May 2017. Krasner received an "A" rating from the National Rifle Association.

Electoral history

Nevada State Assembly District 26, Election, 2018

Incumbent Lisa Krasner defeated June Joseph in the General election for Nevada State Assembly District 26 on November 6, 2018.

Lisa Krasner (Republican)	 57.3%   	20,951

June Joseph (Democrat)	 42.7%   	15,581

Total votes:   36,532

References

External links
 
 Campaign website
 Legislative website

Year of birth missing (living people)
Living people
Republican Party members of the Nevada Assembly
People from California
Politicians from Reno, Nevada
University of California, Los Angeles alumni
University of La Verne alumni
Women state legislators in Nevada
21st-century American politicians
21st-century American women politicians